Domenico Farini (2 July 1834 – 18 January 1900) was an Italian soldier and statesman, who was President of the Italian Senate from 1887 to 1898. He was the son of politician Luigi Carlo Farini.

Biography
Farini was born at Montescudolo, in the Papal States (present-day province of Forlì-Cesena). After a period in Ravenna, he followed his family in exile to Tuscany and then to Osimo and Rome. In 1850 he entered the Military Academy of Turin, and later commanded a Sardinian sapper company during the Second Italian War of Independence. He also took part in the sieges of Ancona and  siege of Gaeta (1861), and in the Third Italian War of Independence. Later he was part of the national staff of the newly formed Italian Army.

Farini was elected into the Italian Chamber of Deputies in 1864, in the college of Ravenna, for the  centre-left coalition. He was president of the Chamber for three times between 1878 and 1884. After a period of absence from the political activities, which he spent at Saluggia in Piedmont, Farini was elected to the Italian Senate in 1886. The following year he was named president of the latter. In that period he wrote a diary, a collection of personal thoughts, which expresses his ideals of unity within the newly formed national monarchy, and his strong anti-clerical position. The book was published by the Italian senate in 1961 with the title Diario di fine secolo.

He died  of cancer in Rome in January 1900.

References

Sources
"Domenico Farini" in the Enciclopedia Italiana's Dizionario Biografico degli Italiani

External links
Page at Italian Senate website 

1834 births
1900 deaths
People from the Province of Forlì-Cesena
People of the Papal States
Historical Right politicians
Presidents of the Chamber of Deputies (Italy)
Deputies of Legislature VIII of the Kingdom of Italy
Deputies of Legislature IX of the Kingdom of Italy
Deputies of Legislature X of the Kingdom of Italy
Deputies of Legislature XI of the Kingdom of Italy
Deputies of Legislature XII of the Kingdom of Italy
Deputies of Legislature XIII of the Kingdom of Italy
Deputies of Legislature XIV of the Kingdom of Italy
Deputies of Legislature XV of the Kingdom of Italy
Presidents of the Italian Senate
Members of the Senate of the Kingdom of Italy
Politicians of Emilia-Romagna
Italian people of the Italian unification
Deaths from cancer in Lazio